Chamlong Daoruang (9 October 1910 - 4 October 1949) is former deputy minister of finance under Thawan Thamrongnawasawat. He is Four Tigers of Isaan such as Chamlong Daoruang, Thong-in Phuripat, Tiang Sirikhanth and Thawin Udol.

Early life
Chamlong was born to a family in Maha Sarakham province in the northeast of Thailand.

Murder
A staunch opponent of the Pibulsongkram dictatorship, which had staged a coup against the elected government, Chamlong and four associates were arrested and murdered by the police under orders of Phibun's ruthless ally, Phao Sriyanond. Their buried remains were discovered in Kanchanaburi province many years later.

Political Work

Election 

 1937 Siamese general election (Maha Sarakham Province)
 1938 Siamese general election (Maha Sarakham Province)
 1946 Siamese general election (Maha Sarakham Province)

Minister 

 Minister under Thawi Bunyaket
 Minister under Seni Pramoj
 Minister under Thawan Thamrongnawasawat
 Minister of Finance under Thawan Thamrongnawasawat

References 

Chamlong Daoruang
1910 births
1949 deaths
Chamlong Daoruang
Chamlong Daoruang
Chamlong Daoruang
Chamlong Daoruang
Chamlong Daoruang